Muhammad ibn Abd al-Karim al-Maghili, commonly known as Muhammad al-Maghili (14401505) was a Berber 'alim from Tlemcen, the capital of the Kingdom of Tlemcen, now in modern-day Algeria. Al-Maghili was responsible for converting the ruling classes to Islam among Hausa, Fulani, and Tuareg peoples in West Africa.

Al-Maghili toured North and West Africa, observing the state of sharia and challenging the status of dhimmis within the region. His radical views on such subjects would set him against many notable Maghrebian scholars and authorities of the time. In the confines of his theological views, Maghili advanced his political thought in the form of legal advice at the courts of West African rulers and still practiced his crafts in the art of Islamic sciences. Though not ushering in drastic change, Maghili played a great role in the Islamization of West Africa, his writing has been copied, studied, and implemented in West Africa ever since its conception, making him one of the most influential figures in the development of Islam in the region.

Maghili's views would result in the persecution of the Jewish community in Tuat and the destruction of the main synagogue at Tamentit. This would occur at the backdrop of anti-dhimmi rhetoric by Maghili and the volatile position of dhimmis within the region.

Most information on Al-Maghili's life can be collected from two sources, Ibn Askar's, Dawhat al-Nashir li-Mahasin man kana min al-Maghrib min Ahl al-Karn al-ashir, and Ahmad Baba al-Tinbukti's, Nayl al-Ibtihaj bi-tatriz al-Dibaz. Original manuscripts of his work are available from the United Nations World Digital Library.

Early life 
Muhammad al-Maghili was born in Tlemcen c. 1440 into a Berber family of the Maghila tribe. In Tlemcen, he devoted himself to the Islamic sciences, studying under Al-Imam Abd al-Rahman al-Tha'alibi (d. 1470/1), a distinguished scholar in the region, and Abu Zakariya Yahya ibn Yadir ibn 'Atiq al-Tadalsi (d. 1472/3), who would become the Qadi of Tuat. Along with the guidance and correspondence with lesser known scholars throughout his life, Al-Maghili became a master of tafsir, hadith, and fiqh, while committing the fundamentals of the Quran to memory. After traveling the Maghreb, observing the state of sharia and the status of dhimmis in the region, Al-Maghili arrived at the court of Fez to debate his views and gain favor with the Wattasid sultan, Abu Zakariya al-Wattasi. Al-Maghili's inflammatory views were not tolerated at Fez, whose jurists turned the sultan against Al-Maghili, prompting him to leave Morocco.

Time in Tuat 
After his dismissal at the court of Fez and a lack of success in gaining support for his work, Al-Maghili settled in the town of Tamentit (1477-8), in the region of Tuat. Tamentit, a major stop on the trans-Saharan trade, was considered one of the gateways to the Sudan region from North Africa. The Jewish community in the region had amassed a great deal of wealth credited to this positioning and the ability to pursue professions that were prohibited for the Muslims, due to their faith. This elevated status and level of influence in the region made it easy for Al-Maghili to stir the anger of the impoverished population against the Jewish community. With the support of his son, Abd Al-Jabbar, Al-Maghili incited a mob to destroy the synagogue at Tamentit, the following disorder would see the mob turn on the Jewish population, resulting in their elimination and expulsion. It is known that Al-Maghili even put a price of seven mithqals of gold on the head of every Jew. Al-Maghili had to flee the region of Tuat after causing such civil and religious strife.

Views on Dhimmis 

Before the rebuttal at the court of Fez and his settlement in Tuat, Al-Maghili had comprised many works and preached his views on the status of dhimmis in the Maghreb region. Al-Maghili was an adherent to the Maliki school of thought and he derived a radical perspective of the school and its views on politics, religion, and society. Al-Maghili's work also reflected the extremist views of society towards the political and social upheaval occurring in the region. This upheaval was caused by external and internal events, such as the Spanish Inquisition and Reconquista, which was causing an influx of refugees, the transgression of Christian powers on Muslim lands, and the ever growing wealth disparity in certain areas.

Al-Maghili believed that Muslims and non-Muslims should live their lives separately, under a strict interpretation of sharia law. With the aid of his son, Al-Maghili tirelessly worked against the Jewish population of Maghreb, with a particular distaste for the Jews of Tuat, whom he believed were destroying Islamic society from within by infiltrating positions of authority. Al-Maghili called for the destruction of all synagogues built under the advent of Islam and to prohibit the construction of new ones. He believed that those who helped or befriended Jews and non-Muslims could rightfully be persecuted. This would culminate in a decree stating for the right of the faithful to murder Jews, confiscate their property, and enslave their women and children.

In the case of the Jews of Tuat, Al-Maghili argued that they had violated their status as dhimmis, which voided the protection and rights they had while living in Muslim lands. The destruction of the synagogue at Tamentit was justified as, according to Al-Maghili, dhimmis were not allowed to practice their religion publicly or erect edifices. The Jews, due to their wealth and status, were blamed of having too much proximity to the religious and political authorities of the region, therefore lacking total humiliation or abasement, as required of dhimmis under Muslim rule. Their lack of public ceremony and untimely submission of the jizya, was also seen as an affront to Muslim rule. Al-Maghili also cited less common rules, such as dress and etiquette of dhimmis as a need for further subjugation.

Time in West Africa 
Al-Maghili's support of such controversial views and the enacting of said views on the Jewish community of Tuat had forced him to move southwards, towards the courts of West African rulers. His time in West Africa is defined more by missionary and scholastic activities and his time spent in the region is believed to extend from 1492 to 1503. Al-Maghili visited the court of the Sultanate of Agadez where he garnered a substantial group of followers, succeeded by travel to prominent sub-Saharan cities such as Takedda, Kano, Katsina, and finally Gao, the former capital city of the Songhai Empire.

Kano 
Al-Maghili was welcomed to the court of Muhammad Rumfa, where he devised ideas on the structure of a government, qualities of an ideal ruler, and the administration of justice. It is around this time that Al-Maghili references to the idea of him being a mujaddid, or reviver of Islam, which is believed to be the introduction of the concept to West Africa, and to an extent he enacted this role of mujaddid by influencing the reformists attempts in Kano. Upon the request of Muhammad Rumfa, Al-Maghili wrote his famous treatise on statecraft, Taj al-din fi ma yajib 'ala I-muluk, translated to “the crown of religion concerning the obligations of kings”, meant to be a guide to good government in line with Islam. Along with writing the Jumla Mukhtasara (1491) translated to the "summarized sentences", which focused on the prevention of crime.

Gao 

Al-Maghili arrived at the court of Gao around 1498, a pivotal time in the history of the Songhai Empire. The ruler of the empire, Askia Mohammad Turi, had just established the Askia dynasty in 1493, and was looking to legitimize his political and religious authority. After toppling the previous Sonni dynasty, which was seen as neglecting Islamic law and practices, the religious identity of the Askia dynasty was split between the authorities of Timbuktu, Gao, the rising clerics within the Askia dynasty, and the newly arrived Al-Maghili. Even after Al-Maghili expressed his views, Askia Mohammad Turi retained a degree of tolerability that was present within Sudanic Islam. Around this time Al-Maghili wrote the “Replies”, a series of seven questions,  some of which had several parts, asked by Askia Mohammad after his return from Hajj, and answered by Al-Maghili. Answers indicate condemnation of the previous ruler of the Sonni dynasty, and therefore legitimization of the Askia dynasty, along with criticism of the local Islamic faith and their clerics. Other topics range from slavery, government, taxation, inheritance, relationship of scholars to the state, instances in which jihad could be declared, the grounds on which one could be considered an unbeliever. Unheard by many Muslims scholars of the time, Al-Maghili solidifies the idea of revolution in the Muslim state, in which jihad could be declared by Muslims to depose of a Muslim government. The real impact of the Replies was not as widely felt in Songhai but throughout history, in times of civil and religious strife, where Al- Maghili's rigid opinions provided answers and stability. However, Askia Mohammad Turi, who had just returned from Hajj, viewed the state of Islam in his lands as being distorted, and was quick to build on and listen to Al-Maghili's ideas. This influence over the political and religious matters of the Songhai ruler allowed Al-Maghili to enact a massacre of Mafusa clerics. The Mafusa are a Berber tribe that formed a majority of the population in the city of Timbuktu and upheld its religious authority. Al-Maghili's influence in Gao would come to an end after hearing of the murder of his son, Abd Al-Jabbar, at the hands of Tuati Jews. Hearing of the murder, Al-Maghili convinced Askia Mohammad Turi, to arrest all Tuati Jews in the area, but Al-Maghili was reprimanded by the Qadi of Timbuktu, Mahmud b. Umar, who secured the release of the Tuati's. Wanting to depart to Tuat as soon as possible, Al-Maghili loses his influential role at court, allowing Timbuktu to take its place as the religious authority in the Songhai Empire for the time being.

Return to Tuat and Death 
Al-Maghili, insisting the massacre of all Tuati's, was denied military support by Askia Mohammad Turi. Facing rejection, Al-Maghili returned to Katsina and petitions the Songhai ruler again for support against Tuat. Whether Al-Maghili received the support is not known but, it is recorded that he returned to Tuat at the head of a considerable force, laying siege to a base in the vicinity of Tamentit, and then proceeding to sack both locations and persecuting their Jewish populations (1503). Al-Maghili retires to his zawiya at Bu Ali in Tuat and passes away in 1504.

See also
Ahmad Baba al Massufi
History of the Jews of Bilad el-Sudan
Muhammad Rumfa
Hausa Kingdoms

References

15th-century births
1505 deaths
15th-century Berber people
16th-century Berber people
Algerian Maliki scholars
Berber Muslims
Berber scholars
15th-century Muslim scholars of Islam
Jews and Judaism in Algeria
Muslims with branch missing
People from Tlemcen